Piyaporn Deejing, nicknamed Deer (born in Bangkok) is a beauty queen from Thailand. She joined the Miss Thailand Universe 2008; she won first runner-up and was also crowned Miss Thailand Earth on May 24, 2008 in Bangkok, Thailand. An Economics student, she stands 173 cm tall and she represented Thailand in Miss Earth 2008 in Philippines and Miss International 2010 in China.

Miss Earth 2008
In the final competition of the eighth edition of the international beauty pageant Miss Earth, Deejing was announced as one of sixteen semi-finalists who moved forward to compete for the title. She ended as one of the top 16 semifinalists of Miss Earth. The Miss Earth pageant was held on November 9, 2008 at the Clark Expo Amphitheater in Angeles, Pampanga, Philippines. Eighty-five delegates arrived from October 19, 2008 in the Philippines. The pageant was broadcast live via ABS-CBN in the Philippines and to many countries worldwide via Star World, The Filipino Channel and other partner networks.

Miss International 2010
On November 7, 2010, she placed 1st runner-up in Miss International 2010 in Chengdu, China.

References

Miss Earth Thailand 2008

External links
Miss Thailand Universe 2008 Official Website

1988 births
Living people
Miss Earth 2008 contestants
Miss International 2010 delegates
Piyaporn Deejing
Miss Earth Thailand